Arafura Rare Earths Limited is an Australian mineral exploration company focusing on rare earth elements. It is headquartered in Perth, Western Australia and was listed on the Australian Stock Exchange (ARU) in 2003. The company's flagship project is the Nolans Rare Earths Project, located in Australia's Northern Territory. The company had plans to develop extensive processing plant infrastructure at False Bay near Whyalla in South Australia, but abandoned these in April 2013 in favour of processing the ore closer to the proposed mine site. Documentation for the processing plant proposal was referred for Federal environmental approval under the EPBC Act, triggering a Controlled Action determination in 2011. Once developed, the Nolans Rare Earth Project will also produce uranium as a secondary product.

References 

Mining companies of Australia
Uranium mining companies of Australia